The Times of Israel is an Israeli multi-language online newspaper that was launched in 2012. It was co-founded by Israeli journalist David Horovitz, who is also the founding editor, and American billionaire investor Seth Klarman. Based in Jerusalem, it "documents developments in Israel, the Middle East and around the Jewish world." Along with its original English site, The Times of Israel publishes in Hebrew, Arabic, French, and Persian. On 1 May 2019, it launched a Hebrew-language news site, Zman Yisrael.

In addition to publishing news reports and analysis, the website hosts a multi-author blog platform.

In February 2014, two years after its launch, The Times of Israel claimed a readership of two million. In 2017, readership increased to 3.5 million unique monthly users. By 2021, the paper had on average over nine million unique users each month and over 35 million monthly page views. It also maintains a blog platform, on which some 9,000 bloggers are active.

History
The Times of Israel was launched in February 2012. Its co-founders are journalist David Horovitz, and American billionaire Seth Klarman, founder of the Baupost Group and chairman of The David Project. Klarman is the chairman of the website.

Several Times of Israel editors had previously worked for the Haaretz English edition, including Joshua Davidovich and Raphael Ahren, and former Haaretz Arab affairs correspondent Avi Isaacharoff — co-creator of the popular Israeli television series, Fauda — joined as its Middle East analyst. Amanda Borschel-Dan, who was the Magazine Editor of The Jerusalem Post, is currently The Times of Israel's Deputy Editor, responsible for the Jewish world and archaeology. She also hosts the paper's weekly podcast.

The Times of Israel launched its Arabic edition, edited by Suha Halifa, on 4 February 2014; its French edition, edited by Stephanie Bitan, on 25 February 2014; and its Persian edition, edited by Avi Davidi, on 7 October 2015. It launched its Hebrew site, Zman Yisael, on 1 May 2019, edited by Biranit Goren.

Both the Arabic and French editions combine translations of English content with original material in their respective languages, and also host a blog platform. In announcing the Arabic edition, Horovitz suggested, The Times of Israel may have created the first Arabic blog platform that "draw[s] articles from across the spectrum of opinion. We're inviting those of our Arabic readers with something of value that they want to say to blog on our pages, respecting the parameters of legitimate debate, joining our marketplace of ideas." "[T]o avoid the kind of anonymous comments that can reduce discussion to toxic lows", comments on news articles and features in all of the site's editions can only be posted by readers identified through their Facebook profiles or equivalent.

In February 2014, two years after its launch, The Times of Israel claimed a readership of 2 million. In 2017, readership increased to 3.5 million. By 2021, the paper had on average over 9 million unique users each month and over 35 million monthly page views. It also maintains a blog platform, on which some 9,000 bloggers post.

On 1 August 2014, an article entitled "When Genocide is Permissible" and recommending the obliteration of the entire population of Gaza Strip was published on the blogs by a regular contributor. The article was later deleted. Opinion editor Miriam Herschberg said that the article did not conform to their editorial guidelines and the contributor had been discontinued.

Since 2016, The Times has hosted the websites of Jewish newspapers in several countries, known as "local partners". In March 2016, it began hosting New York's The Jewish Week. It also hosts Britain's Jewish News, the New Jersey Jewish Standard, The Atlanta Jewish Times, and Pittsburgh Jewish Chronicle. In October 2019, The Australian Jewish News became the seventh local partner.

On 2 November 2017, hackers in Turkey took down the web site of The Times of Israel for three hours, replacing the homepage with anti-Israel propaganda. Responding to the attack, Horovitz said: "We constantly work to improve security on the site, which is subjected to relentless attacks by hackers. How unfortunate, and how badly it reflects on them that the hackers seek to prevent people from reading responsible, independent journalism on Israel, the Middle East and the Jewish world."

In 2020, Reuters reported that The Times of Israel, along with The Jerusalem Post, Algemeiner, and Arutz Sheva, published op-eds sent to them by someone using a falsified identity. The op-eds were removed as soon as the problem was discovered. Opinion editor Miriam Herschlag said that she regretted the scam because it distorted the public discourse and might lead to "barriers that prevent new voices from being heard".

Editorial orientation
According to editor David Horovitz, The Times of Israel is intended to be independent, without any political leanings. The paper's editorial board is composed of former Jerusalem Report editor Sharon Ashley, Irwin Cotler, Efraim Halevy, Saul Singer, and Ehud Yaari. Yehuda Avner was a member of the editorial board until his death in March 2015. Horovitz said in 2012: "We are independent; we're not attached or affiliated with any political party."

Additional media 
In addition to written journalism, The Times of Israel also produces and publishes three podcasts, it also produces video content.
 The Daily Briefing is Times Of Israel's daily news podcast.
 Times Will Tell is a long form weekly revue.
 Paralyzed Nation is a deep look into the Israeli political system.

Investigative journalism
A series of investigative articles, starting with a March 2016 piece by Simona Weinglass titled "The wolves of Tel Aviv: Israel’s vast, amoral binary options scam exposed," helped shed light on a multi-billion-dollar global scam in Israel. As a direct result of The Times of Israel’s investigative reporting on the fraud, on 23 October 2017 the Israeli parliament, the Knesset, unanimously passed a law banning Israel’s binary options industry. The law gave binary options firms in Israel three months since the law was passed to cease operations. After that, anyone involved in binary options is punishable by up to two years in jail.

In a Times of Israel blog, Knesset member Karine Elharrar of Yesh Atid credited the paper for bringing the issue to the attention of Israeli lawmakers: "Over the past year The Times of Israel shone a spotlight on Israel’s ugly binary options industry. It was a case of investigative journalism at its best and The Times of Israel should be proud of its journalists and editors."

Notable writers

Analysts and journalists
 Haviv Rettig Gur
 David Horovitz
 Avi Issacharoff

Competition
The Times of Israel competes for readership with The Jerusalem Post, Arutz Shevas Israel National News, Haaretz, Israel Hayom, and The Forward.

See also
 Mass media in Israel

References

External links

 

2012 establishments in Israel
Arabic-language mass media in Israel
English-language websites
French-language websites
Internet properties established in 2012
Israeli news websites
Mass media in Jerusalem
Multilingual news services
Multilingual websites
Newspapers established in 2012
Persian-language websites